Yannick Passape (born 19 April 1982), is a Guadeloupean professional footballer who plays for the Guadeloupe national football team.

Career statistics

Club

Notes

International

International goals
Scores and results list Guadeloupe's goal tally first.

References

External links
 Yannick Passape at Caribbean Football Database

1982 births
Living people
Association football forwards
Guadeloupean footballers
Guadeloupean expatriate footballers
Guadeloupe international footballers
US Granville players
US Avranches players
US Quevilly-Rouen Métropole players
Jura Sud Foot players
FC Fleury 91 players
CS Moulien players
Expatriate footballers in France